Fritz (Friedrich) Schaper (31 July 1841, Alsleben – 29 November 1919, Berlin) was a German sculptor.

Life 
He was orphaned at an early age, and was sent to Halle to receive instruction at the Francke Foundations. After being apprenticed as a stonemason, he went to Berlin in 1859 for further training at the Prussian Academy of Arts. Afterwards, he became an employee at the workshop of Albert Wolff until establishing his own studios in 1867. He was a professor at the Prussian Academy from 1875 to 1890 and also served as manager of the "Aktsaal" (nude modelling studio). Max Baumbach, Adolf Brütt, Reinhold Felderhoff, Fritz Klimsch, Ludwig Manzel, Max Unger, Joseph Uphues and Wilhelm Wandschneider were among his many well-known students.

He became a full member of the Academy in 1880 and a member of the governing Senate in 1881. He was also an honorary member of the academies in Munich and Dresden. In 1914, he was one of the signatories to the Manifesto of the Ninety-Three, a document supporting Germany's invasion of Belgium.

Other notable works

References

Further reading 
 Jutta von Simson: Fritz Schaper. 1841–1919. Prestel, München 1976, .
 Uwe Hinkfoth: Fritz Schaper, die Wiederentdeckung des Denkmals. Catalog for an exhibition at the Goch Museum Goch, 30 July to 3 September 2000. .

External links 

 
 Sources on Schaper's life and work from the BAM-Portal

1841 births
1919 deaths
People from Salzlandkreis
People from the Province of Saxony
German sculptors
German male sculptors
20th-century sculptors
19th-century sculptors
Prussian Academy of Arts alumni
Academic staff of the Prussian Academy of Arts
Recipients of the Pour le Mérite (civil class)